Ahmed E. Ogwell Ouma (born 1969) is a Kenyan epidemiologist and the acting director of the Africa Centres for Disease Control and Prevention. He is an expert in non-communicable diseases.

Early life and education 
Ogwell is from Kenya. He was at school in Mombasa. He attended the University Of Nairobi, where he completed a Bachelor's in Dental Surgery and a master's degree at the School Of Public Health. In 2000 he moved to the University of Bergen.

Career 
Having lost both his parents and his sister to cancer, Ogwell has dedicated his career to the prevention of non-communicable diseases. He started at the Ministry of Health, where he oversaw the division of non-communicable diseases. He worked with the World Health Organization to create the Framework Convention on Tobacco Control. He started working with the World Health Organization, where he was an advisor for the Global Coordination Mechanism on non-communicable diseases.

Ogwell was hired as the deputy director for Africa Centres for Disease Control and Prevention in 2019. He assumed the role of acting director in 2022 when Dr. John Nkengasong took the position of US ambassador to PEPFAR. Ogwell supported Nkengasong during the COVID-19 pandemic  response as the liaison for partnerships.  

In 2022 he attempted to attend the World Health Organization Global Health Conference. He was held up at Frankfurt Airport, where he was, "“mistreated.. by immigration personnel who imagine I want to stay back illegally,". However he was able to eventually make it to the conference per the WHO representatives coordinating the event.

On 19th February 2023 Mr Ogwell has been replaced by Dr Jean Kaseya from the Democratic Republic of the Congo appointed by AU Assembly as General Director.

Select publications

Personal life 
Ogwell is married with children.

References 

Living people
1969 births
University of Nairobi alumni
Epidemiologists